The 2020 United States House of Representatives elections in Mississippi was held on Tuesday, November 3, 2020, to elect the four U.S. representatives from the U.S. state of Mississippi; one from each of the state's four congressional districts. Primaries are scheduled for March 10, 2020.

Overview

District 1

The 1st district takes in the northeastern area of the state, including Columbus, Oxford, Southaven, and Tupelo. The incumbent is Republican Trent Kelly, who was re-elected with 66.9% of the vote in 2018.

Republican primary

Candidates

Declared
Trent Kelly, incumbent U.S. Representative

Primary results

Democratic primary

Candidates

Declared
Antonia Eliason, University of Mississippi law professor

Primary results

General election

Predictions

Results

District 2

The 2nd district encompasses the Mississippi Delta, taking in most of Jackson, the riverfront cities of Greenville and Vicksburg, and the interior market cities of Clarksdale, Greenwood and Clinton. The incumbent is Democrat Bennie Thompson, who was re-elected with 71.8% of the vote in 2018 without major-party opposition.

Democratic primary

Candidates

Declared
Sonia Rathburn, non-profit owner
Bennie Thompson, incumbent U.S. Representative

Primary results

Republican primary

Candidates

Declared
Thomas Carey, realtor
Brian Flowers, nuclear worker, Navy veteran
B.C. Hammond, volunteer firefighter, farmer and a small business owner

Primary results

Runoff results

General election

Predictions

Results

District 3

The 3rd district is located in eastern and southwestern Mississippi, taking in Meridian, Starkville, Pearl, Natchez, and most of the wealthier portions of Jackson, including the portion of the city located in Rankin County. The incumbent is Republican Michael Guest, who was elected with 62.3% of the vote in 2018.

Republican primary

Candidates

Declared
Michael Guest, incumbent U.S. Representative
James Tulp, radio broadcaster

Primary results

Democratic primary

Candidates

Declared
Dorothy "Dot" Benford, activist
Katelyn Lee, veterinary medical technologist

Primary results

General election

Predictions

Results

District 4

The 4th district encompasses the Mississippi Gulf Coast, including Gulfport, Biloxi, Hattiesburg, Bay St. Louis, Laurel, and Pascagoula. The incumbent is Republican Steven Palazzo, who was elected with 68.2% of the vote in 2018.

Republican primary

Candidates

Declared
Carl Boyanton, businessman
Robert Deming, Biloxi city councilman
Samuel Hickman, former staffer for U.S. Representative Trent Kelly
Steven Palazzo, incumbent U.S. Representative

Primary results

General election

Predictions

Results

References

External links
 
 
  (State affiliate of the U.S. League of Women Voters)
 

Official campaign websites for 1st district candidates
 Antonia Eliason (D) for Congress
 Trent Kelly (R) for Congress

Official campaign websites for 2nd district candidates
 Brian Flowers (R) for Congress
 Bennie Thompson (D) for Congress

Official campaign websites for 3rd district candidates
 Dorothy "Dot" Benford (D) for Congress 
 Michael Guest (R) for Congress

Official campaign websites for 4th district candidates
 Steven Palazzo (R) for Congress

Mississippi
2020
House